Ban of Croatia was the title of local rulers or office holders and after 1102, viceroys of Croatia. From the earliest periods of the Croatian state, some provinces were ruled by bans as a ruler's representative (viceroy) and supreme military commander. In the 18th century, Croatian bans eventually became the chief government officials in Croatia. 

They were at the head of the Ban's Government, effectively the first prime ministers of Croatia. The institution of ban persisted until the first half of the 20th century, when it was officially superseded in function by that of a parliamentary prime minister.

Origin of title 

Bans during the Trpimirović dynasty
References from the earliest periods are scarce, but history recalls that the first known Croatian ban is Pribina from the 10th century. In the early Middle Ages, the ban was the royal district governor of Lika, Gacka and Krbava. Later, the meaning of the title was elevated to that of provincial governor in the Kingdom of Croatia. King Demetrius Zvonimir was originally a ban serving under King Peter Krešimir IV.

Croatian bans after 1102 
After the Croats elected King Coloman of Hungary as King of Croatia 1102, the title of ban acquired the meaning of viceroy. Bans were appointed by the Hungarian king as his representatives in Kingdom of Croatia, heads of the parliament (sabor) and also as supreme commander of Croatian Army.

Croatia was governed by the viceregal ban as a whole from 1102 until 1225, when it was split into two separate regions of Slavonia and Croatia. Two different bans were occasionally appointed until 1476, when the institution of a single ban was resumed. Most bans were native nobles but some were also of Hungarian ancestry.

Most notable bans from this period were Pavao Šubić and Peter Berislavić.

Bans of Croatia, Slavonia and Dalmatia

Bans of Croatia and Dalmatia

From 1225 to 1476, there were parallel Bans of Croatia and Dalmatia and of "Whole Slavonia". The following is the list of the former, the latter are listed at the article Ban of Slavonia. During the period of separate titles of ban, several persons held both titles, which is indicated in the notes.

After the death of King Louis I of Hungary, his daughter Mary succeeded to the throne, which led to kings Charles III and Ladislaus of Naples claiming the Kingdom of Hungary. A war erupted between forces loyal to Mary, and later to her husband and successor Sigismund of Luxembourg, and those loyal to Ladislaus.

During this time, Sigismund appointed Nicholas II Garai (who was also count palatine) the Ban of Croatia and Dalmatia in 1392, Butko Kurjaković in 1394, and then again Garai in the period from 1394 to 1397. Nicholas II Garai was also at the time the Ban of Slavonia, succeeded by Ladislav Grđevački (1402–1404), Paul Besenyő (1404), Pavao Peć (1404–1406), Hermann II of Celje (1406–1408).

Ladislaus in turn appointed his own bans. In 1409, this dynastic struggle was resolved when Ladislaus sold his rights over Dalmatia to the Republic of Venice.

Bans of Croatia, Slavonia and Dalmatia

From 1476 onwards, the titles of Ban of Dalmatia and Croatia, and Ban of "Whole Slavonia" are again united in the single title of Ban of Croatia, Slavonia and Dalmatia.

Habsburg-era bans 
The title of ban persisted in Croatia after 1527 when the country became part of the Habsburg monarchy, and continued all the way until 1918.

Among the most distinguished bans in Croatian history were the three members of Zrinski family Nikola Šubić Zrinski and his great-grandsons Nikola Zrinski and Petar Zrinski. Also there are two notable Erdődys: Toma Erdődy, great warrior and statesman, and Ivan Erdődy, to whom Croatia owes much for protecting her rights against the Hungarian nobility, his most widely known saying in Latin is Regnum regno non praescribit leges (A kingdom may not proscribe laws to another kingdom.)

In the 18th century, Croatian bans eventually became chief government officials in Croatia. They were at the head of Ban's Government, effectively the first prime ministers of Croatia. The most known bans of that era were Josip Jelačić, Ivan Mažuranić and Josip Šokčević.

Bans in the Habsburg Monarchy

The Habsburg dynasty ruled Kingdom of Croatia and Kingdom of Slavonia between 1527 and 1918.

Bans during the Revolutions of 1848

Croatia was a Habsburg crown territory during the Revolutions of 1848 and up until 1867.

Bans in Austria-Hungary

Croatia was returned to Hungarian control in 1867 when the Habsburg Empire was reconstituted as the dual monarchy of Austria-Hungary. Between then and 1918 the following bans were appointed:

Croatian bans in the Kingdom of Yugoslavia 
Ban was also the title of the governor of each province (banovina) of the Kingdom of Yugoslavia between 1929 and 1941. The weight of the title was far less than that of a medieval ban's feudal office. Most of Croatian territory was divided between the Sava and Littoral Banovina, but also some parts were outside this provinces.

In 1939 Banovina of Croatia was created with Cvetković-Maček agreement as a unit of limited autonomy. It consisted of the Sava and Littoral Banovinas along with smaller parts of Vrbas, Zeta, Drina and Danube Banovina's. Ivan Šubašić was appointed for the Ban of Banovina of Croatia until the collapse of Kingdom of Yugoslavia in 1941. Šubašić was also the last person who held the position of Croatian Ban.

Bans within the Kingdom of Serbs, Croats and Slovenes

Following a brief period of self-rule at the end of World War I, Croatia was incorporated into the Kingdom of the Serbs, Croats and Slovenes in 1918, under the Karađorđević dynasty.

Bans of the Sava Banovina 
In 1929, the new Constitution of the Kingdom renamed it Kingdom of Yugoslavia and split up the country into banovinas.

Bans of the Littoral Banovina

Bans of the Banovina of Croatia 
In 1939, the Banovina of Croatia was created with Cvetković-Maček agreement as a unit of limited autonomy within Kingdom of Yugoslavia. It consisted of the Sava and Littoral Banovinas along with smaller parts of Vrbas, Zeta, Drina and Danube Banovinas.

See also

 Croatian Parliament
 List of rulers of Croatia
 History of Croatia
 Timeline of Croatian history
 Tabula Banalis

References

External links
 "Bans of Croatia and Dalmatia (style Ban Hrvatske i Dalmacije)" at World Statesmen.org

Barons of the realm (Kingdom of Hungary)
Kingdom of Croatia
 
Croatia history-related lists
1941 disestablishments in Croatia